Keith Spencer Waterhouse  (6 February 1929 – 4 September 2009) was a British novelist and newspaper columnist and the writer of many television series.

Biography
Keith Waterhouse was born in Hunslet, Leeds, West Riding of Yorkshire, England. He performed two years of national service in the Royal Air Force.

His credits, many with lifelong friend and collaborator Willis Hall, include satires such as That Was The Week That Was, BBC-3 and The Frost Report during the 1960s; the book for the 1975 musical The Card;  Budgie; Worzel Gummidge; and Andy Capp (an adaptation of the comic strip).

His 1959 book Billy Liar was subsequently filmed by John Schlesinger with Tom Courtenay as Billy. It was nominated in six categories of the 1964 BAFTA awards, including Best Screenplay, and was nominated for the Golden Lion at the Venice Film Festival in 1963; in the early 1970s the sitcom Billy Liar based on the character was quite popular and ran to 25 episodes.

Waterhouse's first screenplay was the film Whistle Down the Wind (1961). Without receiving screen credit, Waterhouse and Hall extensively rewrote the original script for Alfred Hitchcock's Torn Curtain (1966). Waterhouse wrote the comic play, Jeffrey Bernard is Unwell (1989; Old Vic premiere, 1999), based on the louche life of London journalist Jeffrey Bernard.

His career began at the Yorkshire Evening Post and he also wrote regularly for Punch, the Daily Mirror, and latterly for the Daily Mail. He initially joined the Mirror as a reporter in 1952, before he became a playwright and novelist; during his initial stint, he campaigned against the colour bar in post-war Britain, the abuses committed in the name of the British Empire in Kenya and the British government's selling of weapons to various Middle Eastern countries.  Subsequently, he returned as a columnist, initially in the Mirror Magazine, moving to the main newspaper on 22 June 1970, on Mondays, and extending to Thursdays from 16 July 1970. Extracts from the columns were published in the books Mondays, Thursdays and Rhubarb, Rhubarb and Other Noises.

His extended style book for the Daily Mirror, Waterhouse on Newspaper Style, is regarded as a classic textbook for modern journalism. This was followed by a pocket book on English usage intended for a wider audience entitled English Our English (And How To Sing It). He moved from the Mirror to the Mail in 1986 out of his objection to the Mirror'''s ownership by Robert Maxwell, and remained at the Mail until shortly before his death.

He fought long crusades to highlight what he perceived to be a decline in the standards of modern English; for example, he founded the Association for the Abolition of the Aberrant Apostrophe, whose members attempt to stem the tide of such solecisms as "potatoe's" and "pound's of apple's and orange's" in greengrocers' shops.

In February 2004, he was voted Britain's most admired contemporary columnist by the British Journalism Review''.

Death
On 4 September 2009, a statement released by his family announced that Waterhouse had died quietly in his sleep at his home in London. He was 80 years old.

Works

References

External links 

 Keith Waterhouse in conversation (BBC TV 1985)
 
 Times of London obituary
 Keith Waterhouse - Daily Telegraph obituary
 Keith Waterhouse - Guardian obituary
 The Keith Waterhouse archive is housed at Special Collections and Archives, Cardiff University.

1929 births
2009 deaths
Daily Mail journalists
Daily Mirror people
Punch (magazine) people
British male journalists
Commanders of the Order of the British Empire
English columnists
English essayists
English satirists
Fellows of the Royal Society of Literature
Writers from Leeds
20th-century Royal Air Force personnel
British male dramatists and playwrights
20th-century English novelists
21st-century English novelists
British male essayists
English male novelists
20th-century English dramatists and playwrights
20th-century essayists
21st-century essayists
20th-century English male writers
21st-century English male writers
English male non-fiction writers
People from Hunslet